Hunting Season is an American LGBT-themed comedy-drama web series created by Jon Marcus. Following the romantic and sexual exploits of Alex (Ben Baur) and his small group of friends in New York City, the story was inspired by and largely based on the 2005–08 blog The Great Cock Hunt and the 2008 novel of the same name published by Kensington Books.

Season one premiered in September 2012 with eight short-format webisodes. Season two, funded by a 2013 Kickstarter crowdfunding campaign that raised $151,406, premiered in May 2015 and consisted of four longer episodes. The series's theme music was composed by Jake Monaco.

Premise
Hunting Season follows Alex, a single, gay, 20-something blogger for Gawker in Manhattan who begins writing anonymously about his wild social life.

Characters
 Ben Baur as Alex
 Marc Sinoway as Tommy
 Jake Manabat as TJ
 Tyler French as Reese
 Brit-Charde Sellers as Shania
 Pressly Coker as Hot Sales Guy
 Joshua Warr as Harris

Season 1
 Walker Hare as Lenny
 Jack Ferver as Nick
 Kate Geller as Lizzie
 David Lavine as Ben

Season 2
 Quinn Jackson as Jamie
 Yuval Boim as Will
 Ken Barnett as Josh King
 Hunter Hoffman as Reagan
 Nic Cory as Aron
 David Garelik as Nico
 Ryan Barry as Luke

Episodes

Season 1 (2012)

Season 2 (2015)

Development and production
Creator Jon Marcus was inspired to produce his own web series after watching The Guild (2007–2013) and later Web Therapy (2008–2014). He said in 2012:

The story is inspired by and largely based on the 2005–08 blog The Great Cock Hunt and the 2008 novel of the same name published by Kensington Books. A fan of the blog as it was being published, Marcus told Next Magazine in 2012, "My friends all passed it around. It was really hot, it was really fun and it reminded us all of being in New York, which I had been in my 20s and it was just addictive." During the period of the blog's run, three cable TV networks directed at LGBT viewers had been launched: Q, Here! and Logo. Noting the popularity of the racy gay drama series Queer as Folk (2000–05) on Showtime, Marcus thought one of these networks would be interested in a show about single gay men in New York. He contacted the anonymous writer of the blog and optioned it for development as a series. Marcus said in a 2012 AfterElton interview:

Marcus shelved the idea for a few years when he found that "no one in the business wanted to make the show I wanted to make". He revisited the project in 2010 as he noticed the increased popularity and accessibility of online programming. Marcus enlisted Adam Baran, and the two began adapting the blog into scripts, while also fleshing out certain characters and expanding the concept to both appeal to a wider audience and to avoid stereotypes.

Hunting Season is set and filmed in New York City. Marcus financed the first season himself with "very, very little money", and a 2013 Kickstarter crowdfunding campaign to finance season 2 of the series raised $151,406.

Broadcast
The first three episodes of Hunting Season were released online on Wednesday, September 12, 2012. Five more episodes followed, one released every subsequent Wednesday until October 17, 2012. An uncensored edition of the series, containing nudity, was available for paid download at HuntingSeason.tv, while a censored edition was freely available LOGOtv.com. In August 2013, the uncensored version of season 1 became available for paid download from Vimeo On Demand, with the censored version free for viewing at HuntingSeason.tv.

Season 2 premiered on Vimeo on May 5, 2015.

Season 1 consists of eight short-format webisodes of between 9 and 12 minutes in duration, and the four episodes of season 2 are between 21 and 30 minutes long.

Reception
Emily Rome of Entertainment Weekly called the series a "gay Sex and the City", and noted its "full-frontal nudity". Next Magazine called Hunting Season "sexy" and "racy", noting that "the series has also gained attention for its large amount of nude scenes". In January 2016, Out named Alex as one of its "30 Most Eligible Gay TV Characters", after previously naming Baur to its Out100 list in 2015.

Awards and nominations

References

External links
 
 

2012 web series debuts
American comedy web series
American drama web series
American LGBT-related web series
Gay-related television shows